The Virgil "Buddy" Raines Distinguished Achievement Award was established in 1996 by Monmouth Park Racetrack in Oceanport, New Jersey in honor of the trainer, Virgil W. Raines. The annual award honors an owner or trainer competing at the track who has shown a dedication to the sport of Thoroughbred racing through exemplary conduct demonstrating professionalism and integrity.

Recipients
 1996 - J. Willard Thompson
 1997 - Daniel Perlsweig
 1998 - Warren A. Croll Jr.
 1999 - Joseph H. Pierce Jr.
 2000 - Peter Shannon
 2001 - Dennis Drazin
 2002 - Sam Fieramosca
 2003 - Charles & Marianne Hesse
 2004 - Janet Laszlo 
 2005 - Richard Malouf 
 2006 - John H. Forbes
 2007 - Ben W. Perkins Sr. 
 2008 - Gerald & Carolyn Sleeter
 2012 - John Mazza
 2013 - Everett "Ebby" Novak
 2014 - Chuck Spina
 2015 - Bob Baffert
 2016 - Ed Barney
 2017 - Bob Kulina
 2018 - Mike Musto
 2019 - Tim Hills
 2020 - Leonard Green
 2021 - Bill Anderson
 2022 - Millie Fleming

References

 The 2008 Virgil W. Raines Award at Monmouth Park

Horse racing awards
Monmouth Park Racetrack